Sir Graham Graham-Montgomery, 3rd Baronet,  (9 July 1823 – 2 June 1901) was a Scottish baronet and member of the British House of Commons.

Life 

Graham-Montgomery entered the House of Commons in 1852 as a member for Peeblesshire, and held the seat until 1868, when it was united with that of Selkirk. He was returned for the newly unified constituency, and held it through 1880. 

He was a junior Lord of the Treasury from 1866 until 1868. He was also Lord Lieutenant of Kinross-shire from 1854 until his death in 1901.

He lived in Kinross House and is buried east of the house on the edge of Loch Leven. His family lie with him.

References

1823 births
1901 deaths
Lord-Lieutenants of Kinross-shire
Members of the Parliament of the United Kingdom for Scottish constituencies
Baronets in the Baronetage of the United Kingdom
UK MPs 1852–1857
UK MPs 1857–1859
UK MPs 1859–1865
UK MPs 1865–1868
UK MPs 1868–1874
UK MPs 1874–1880
Conservative Party (UK) MPs for English constituencies